Kyaw Swe is a Burmese name and may mean:

 Kyaw Swe (actor), Burmese actor and film director
 Kyaw Swe (minister), Minister of Home Affairs of Myanmar
 Kyaw Swe (politician), Burmese politician currently serving as a House of Nationalities MP